Linden Aggrey Kaunda Fraser (born 4 September 1964) is a Guyanese cricketer. He played in four first-class matches for Guyana from 1983 to 1990.

See also
 List of Guyanese representative cricketers

References

External links
 

1964 births
Living people
Guyanese cricketers
Guyana cricketers